The Yoshino River (吉野川 Yoshino-gawa) is a river on the island of Shikoku, Japan. It is the second longest river in Shikoku (slightly shorter than the Shimanto), and is the only river whose watershed spreads over the four prefectures of the island.

It is regarded as one of the three greatest rivers of Japan along with the Tone and the Chikugo, and is nicknamed Shikoku Saburō (四国三郎; Saburō is a popular given name for a third son).

The Yoshino rises from Mount Kamegamori (瓶ケ森) in Ino, Kōchi Prefecture and flows to the east. In Ōtoyo it turns to the north and crosses the Shikoku Mountains. The gorge, named Ōboke Koboke, is a famous tourist attraction of Shikoku. In Ikeda, Tokushima Prefecture it turns to the east again and pours into the Kii Channel at the north of Tokushima city. Its major tributaries include Ananai, Iya, Dōzan, Sadamitsu, and Anabuki.

The river has some "submerged bridges" (潜水橋 Sensuikyō), equivalents of Chinkabashi of the Shimanto, which lack parapets in order not to be washed away by floods. 

The river was the subject of controversy in January 2000 when around half of eligible local residents showed up to the polls and overwhelmingly voted against a proposed dam construction across the river, with 102,759 (90.14%) registering a "no" vote and only 9,367 (8.22%) giving a "yes" vote (1.64% of votes were deemed invalid). This was considered unusual in a country where pork barrel public works projects were common and often welcomed by locals in provincial areas. Ironically, one author has argued that because of earlier local reforms which required a 50% turnout rate for referendums to pass through, pro-dam lobbyists likely urged "yes" supporters to not turn out to vote in the hopes that the total turnout would be less than 50% and thus invalidate the inevitable "no" vote. The entire episode led to a heated struggle between opposed locals and pro-dam lobbyists over the project. Reconstruction of the Yoshino Daiju Dam (吉野川第十堰 Yoshino-gawa Daijūzeki) near its mouth provoked much controversy among environmentalists.

References

External links

Rivers of Kōchi Prefecture
Rivers of Tokushima Prefecture
Rivers of Japan
Yoshinogawa, Tokushima
Miyoshi, Tokushima